Vlad and Niki is a YouTube channel featuring Russian American-born brothers Vladislav Vashketov (born February 26, 2013) and Nikita Vashketov (born June 4, 2015). Their parents, Sergey and Victoria Vashketov, originate from Moscow, Russia and run 21 YouTube channels in 18 languages. The children reside in Miami, Florida and occasionally Dubai, United Arab Emirates. Their main channel is the 8th most-viewed and 10th most-subscribed in the world.

History 
Vlad and Nikita started their YouTube channel on April 23, 2018, prompting their father to quit his sales job to help with brands and licensing. Their videos include roleplays, vlogging, and advertising. The channel signed a representation deal with Haven Global, an Australian-based licensing agency, to develop new content, consumer products, and licenses for mobile apps under their brand. They also signed a deal with Playmates Toys, a Hong Kong-based manufacturer, to produce toys under their brand. In 2019, the brothers were judged to be the YouTubers making the most money per video at an estimated US$312,000 per video.

References 

American people of Russian descent
Living people
YouTube vloggers
American YouTubers
YouTube channels launched in 2018
Year of birth missing (living people)